Plaxomicrus violaceomaculatus is a species of beetle in the family Cerambycidae. It was described by Pic in 1912.

References

Astathini
Beetles described in 1912